The Ultimate Dr. John is a compilation album by New Orleans R&B artist Dr. John.  Focusing on his early years as a recording artist, it was released in 1987.

Track listing
All tracks composed by Mac Rebennack (Dr. John) except where indicated.
 "Right Place, Wrong Time" – 2:50
 "Such A Night"  – 2:55
 "Traveling Mood" (James Waynes) – 3:03
 "What Comes Around (Goes Around)"  – 3:10
 "Me-You=Loneliness"  – 3:03
 "Let's Make A Better World" – 2:54
 "Iko Iko" (James "Sugar Boy" Crawford) – 4:08
 "Let the Good Times Roll" (Earl King) - 3:56
 "Junko Partner" (Bob Shad) - 4:27
 "Those Lonely Lonely Nights" (Earl King, Johnny Vincent) - 2:30
 "Huey Smith Medley" a) High Blood Pressure b) Don't You Just Know It c) Well I'll Be John Brown (Huey "Piano" Smith, Johnny Vincent) - 3:17
 "Mardi Gras Day"  - 8:08
 "Mama Roux" (Rebennack, Jessie Hill) - 2:55
 "I Walk on Guilded Splinters" - 7:57

References 

Dr. John albums
1987 compilation albums